The 1947 Ball State Cardinals football team was an American football team that represented Ball State Teachers College (later renamed Ball State University) as an independent during the 1947 college football season. In their 12th season under head coach John Magnabosco, the Cardinals compiled a 5–1–2 record.

Schedule

References

Ball State
Ball State Cardinals football seasons
Ball State Cardinals football